Variņi Parish is an administrative territorial entity of Smiltene Municipality, Latvia. Prior to the 2009 administrative reforms it was part of Valka District.

Towns, villages and settlements of Variņi Parish 
  - parish administrative center

References 

Parishes of Latvia
Smiltene Municipality